The vegetation in Tasmania's alpine environments is predominately woody and shrub-like. One vegetation type is coniferous shrubbery, characterised by the gymnosperm species Microcachrys tetragona, Pherosphaera hookeriana, Podocarpus lawrencei, and Diselma archeri. Distribution of these species is relevant with abiotic factors including edaphic conditions and fire frequency, and increasingly, the threat of climate change towards species survival exists. Conservation and management of coniferous shrubbery are necessary considering that the paleoendemic species, Microcachrys, Pherosphaera and Diselma, have persisted in western Tasmanian environments for millions of years.

Distribution 
These coniferous shrub species are restricted to subalpine and alpine heathlands in western Tasmania, with the exception of Podocarpus lawrencei which lives on the mainland. The alpine environments where these conifers occur have high levels of conifer endemism, which is an ecologically habitat for coniferous shrub species.

Coniferous shrub species can be observed in Mount Field National Park in Tasmania's south west along the Tarn Shelf. All species can be observed in rocky environments with shallow soil above .

Ecology 
Both the alpine environment and the harsh maritime climate have the pressures and limitations of wind exposure and ice abrasion for the woody and shrub-like habit of coniferous shrubbery. The lack of protective snow cover on Tasmanian mountains means that vegetation must be mechanically resistant to these elements, hence an ecologically habitat for coniferous shrub species. This is contrasted to alps of mainland Australia or New Zealand, where the presence of prolonged snow lie lead to the development of a grassland-herbland vegetation community.

Low productivity of the environment is indicated through the slow growth habit of the conifers, and the effects of fire are detrimental to the species. As well as this, physiological drought intolerance in conifers could influence the growth of vegetation considering the changing climate. The mosaic pattern of distribution is due to both fire history and the influence of precipitation and temperature. The exceptionally high species richness in subalpine vegetation is caused by this mosaic of vegetation communities.

Floristics 
Taxa that make up this vegetation type include:

Paleoendemism 
The alpine vegetation of western Tasmania is associated with paleoendemic species, i.e. species that are old and geographically confined. Microchachrys, Pherosphaera and Diselma are paleoendemic coniferous shrub clades of alpine western Tasmania. These clades were found on other southern hemisphere continents according to fossil, and they are restricted in their distribution. The environment they inhabit currently is not productive with infrequent fire, which is evident through the short and open canopy structure of the vegetation. Distribution of paleoendemic species gives insight into the similarities to environments in which ancestral lineages occurred and the current environmental characteristics allowing the species survival. Persistence of these species is due to natural selection, not dispersal limitation. The conservation of certain ecological characteristics promotes survival. The table below shows clade ages and scores of paleoendemism, which are calculated by dividing the age of the clade by the square root of the area of current occupancy. Scores of >500 m−1 are considered high.

Threats
Tasmania is one of 5 global hotspots for conifer diversity, with one of the highest rates of endemism in conifer flora in the world. The threats of climate change to Tasmanian coniferous shrubbery exist. Physical intolerance to drought and fire sensitivity are characteristic of the conifers and potential for distribution and recolonization is limited by ways of seed dispersal and slow growth rates.

In Tasmania, climate change is a rise in mean annual temperature, changed rainfall seasonality and weather events such as drought and fire. Dry lightning and drier soil conditions in western Tasmania pose a threat to coniferous shrubbery and other alpine vegetation types. The probability that extreme weather events cause that the extinction of species is higher than the effects of rise in temperature or rainfall.

Conservation  
For conservation of the Tasmanian coniferous shrubbery species, monitoring and prediction of climate events and refugia are fundamental. Field surveys and aerial photograph monitoring is in place in order to collect the required information. In order to reduce the risk of fire, 'fuel stove only areas' have been implemented in the Tasmanian Wilderness World Heritage Area, where the majority of Tasmanian coniferous shrubbery is located. These measures have been introduced in the hope of preventing the loss of conifer populations in both rainforest and alpine communities and to promote their survival into the foreseeable future.

References 

Botany
Ecology
Ecological succession
Habitat
Biology terminology
Plant ecology
Plants